Aiginio railway station is a railway station in Korinos, Central Macedonia, Greece. It is served by regional trains between Thessaloniki, Kalambaka, Palaiofarsalos and by the Suburban services for Thessaloniki, Litochoro and Larissa.

History
The station opened in 2000, replacing an older station of the same name further down the same line. The following year, in 2001, the infrastructure element of OSE was created, known as GAIAOSE, it would henceforth be responsible for the maintenance of stations, bridges and other elements of the network, as well as the leasing and the sale of railway assists. In 2003, OSE launched "Proastiakos SA", as a subsidiary to serve the operation of the suburban network in the urban complex of Athens during the 2004 Olympic Games. In 2005, TrainOSE was created as a brand within OSE to concentrate on rail services and passenger interface. In 2008, all Proastiakos were transferred from OSE to TrainOSE. By 2014 however, the station buildings were rundown and unused. However, trains still called at the unstaffed halt.

Facilities
When the station opened, it was equipped with a purpose-built booking hall and four platforms, with shelters. The platforms were (and still are) connected by subways. However, the station is not equipped with lifts. (As of 2020) The station is unstaffed, with buildings in a poor state of repair. The station is equipped with onsite parking.

Services
The station is on the main line of the Greek railway system that connects Athens in the south with Thessaloniki in the North (however, Intercity services do not call at the station), however slower Fast Trains do call at the station. The city is also connected directly with Larissa and Thessaloniki via the Proastiakos It is served by local stopping services to Thessaloniki, Kalambaka and Palaiofarsalos and by Proastiakos Thessaloniki to Larissa and Thessaloniki. There are around 22 services that call at the station daily.

Station layout

See also
Railway stations in Greece
Hellenic Railways Organization
Hellenic Train
Proastiakos
P.A.Th.E./P.

References

External links
https://www.gtp.gr/TDirectoryDetails.asp?ID=77269

Railway stations in Central Macedonia
Railway stations opened in 2000
Buildings and structures in Pieria (regional unit)
Katerini